Salter Point is a suburb of Perth, Western Australia, located in the City of South Perth local government area.

Around 1880, Samuel August Salter (after whom Salter Point was named) worked as a sawyer and timber contractor on the peninsula. At the time, the area was completely undeveloped, surrounded by dense bush with no road access.

Salter established a landing stage on the point known as "Salter's Landing", to which timber logs could be floated from where they were cut in Kelmscott and Jarrahdale for transportation to a mill by barge. Salter operated his business from this location for several years, leading to the area being renamed "Salter Point".

Samuel August Salter (1849–1930) son of British migrants Samuel and Sarah Salter, and brother to Hannah.  Hannah Buckingham (Salter) married Thomas Buckingham in 1871 and lived in Kelmscott.

In 1929 a road to the location was made.

In 1955, the area comprising Manning, Mt Henry, Salter Point and Waterford was annexed to the South Perth Road Board from the Canning Road Board.

In 1990, the suburb's name Salter Point was gazetted.

The foreshore along the Canning River has been studied for management plans.

Educational facilities
 Como Secondary College, public co-educational secondary college, years 7-12
 Aquinas College, private boys' college, years 4–12
 Manning Primary School, co-educational public primary school, ages 4-12
 St Pius X, private co-educational primary school

Notes

References
 Cecil C. Florey, Peninsula city: a social history of the City of South Perth, City of South Perth, 1995, p. 125-6.
 Heritage Council of Western Australia, Page 4 "Documentary Evidence" 
 City of South Perth Municipal Heritage Inventory "Origin and Meaning of Street and Place Names" Updated September 2005 Page 87 - 88

Suburbs of Perth, Western Australia
Suburbs in the City of South Perth
Canning River (Western Australia)
Populated places established in 1890